Lamiplast is a Spanish home-improvement retailer . Founded in 1962, the company is based in Valencia, Spain. The company owns and operates six stores and one warehouse and distribution center in Valencian Community and  Madrid. The company operates its stores under the commercial brands Lamiplast (Entre Profesionales) and Diseño y Colección Lamiplast.
In 2006, the company became one of the official sponsors of the Valencia CF Spanish football team.

Retail companies established in 1962
Retail companies of Spain
Spanish companies established in 1962
Companies based in Valencia